The tunnel rats were American, Australian, New Zealander, and South Vietnamese soldiers who performed underground search and destroy missions during the Vietnam War.

Later, similar teams were used by the Soviet Army during the Soviet–Afghan War and by the Israel Defense Forces in campaigns in the Middle East.

History

Vietnam War
During the Vietnam War, "tunnel rat" became an unofficial specialty for volunteer combat engineers and infantrymen from the Australian Army and the U.S. Army who cleared and destroyed enemy tunnel complexes. Their motto was the tongue-in-cheek Latin phrase Non Gratus Anus Rodentum ("not worth a rat's ass"). 

In the early stages of the war against the French colonial forces, the Viet Minh created an extensive underground system of tunnels, which was later expanded and improved by the Viet Cong. By the 1960s, the tunnel complexes included hospitals, training areas, storage facilities, headquarters, and barracks. These diverse facilities, coupled with sophisticated ventilation systems, allowed VC guerrillas to remain hidden underground for months at a time.

During the Vietnam War, ANZUS troops uncovered a great number of enemy tunnels while patrolling or conducting larger operations.  The men of the 3 Field Troop, an Australian combat engineering unit that served in Vietnam from 1965-1966, have made a convincing argument that they were the first allied troops to enter the tunnels. Tunnel rats were given the task of destroying them, gathering intelligence within them, and killing or capturing their occupants—often in conditions of close combat. Typically, a tunnel rat was equipped with only a standard issue M1911 pistol or M1917 revolver, a bayonet, a flashlight, and explosives.

Many tunnel rats reportedly came to dislike the intense muzzle blast of the relatively large .45 caliber round, as the .45's loud report could often leave one temporarily deaf when fired in a confined space. Consequently, some preferred to clear tunnels armed with a .38 Special revolver equipped with a sound suppressor and other non-standard weapons. "A few of the OSS-ordered World War II era suppressed High Standard HD .22 automatics made their way into Tunnel Rat hands. But these weapons were very few in number and wanted by a number of other special units. Personal weapons were used by the rats, ranging from .25 caliber automatics to sawn-off shotguns."

Besides enemy combatants, the tunnels themselves presented many potential dangers to tunnel rats. Sometimes they were poorly constructed and they would simply collapse. Tunnels were often booby trapped with hand grenades, anti-personnel mines, and punji sticks. The VC would even use venomous snakes (placed as living booby traps). Rats, spiders, scorpions, and ants also posed threats to tunnel rats. Bats also roosted in the tunnels, although they were generally more of a nuisance than a threat. Tunnel construction occasionally included anti-intruder features such as U-bends that could be flooded quickly to trap and drown the tunnel rat. Sometimes poison gases were used. A tunnel rat might therefore choose to enter the tunnels wearing a gas mask (donning one within was frequently impossible in such a confined space). According to U.S. tunnel rat veterans, however, most tunnel rats usually went without gas masks because wearing one made it even harder to see, hear, and breathe in the narrow dark passages.

Tunnel rats were generally men of smaller stature ( and under), who were able to maneuver more comfortably in the narrow tunnels. Tom Mangold and John Penycate, authors of one of the definitive accounts of tunnel warfare during the Vietnam War, reported that the U.S. tunnel rats were almost exclusively soldiers of European or Hispanic descent, many of whom were Puerto Rican or Mexican American.

By Mangold and Penycate's account, the contributions of tunnel rats first garnered public attention in January 1966, after a combined U.S. and Australian operation against the Củ Chi tunnels in Bình Dương Province, known as Operation Crimp. The "Diehards" of the U.S. Army's 1st Engineer Battalion, whose exploits are featured in Mangold and Penycate's book, later claimed a special place for tunnel rats in American military history during their rotation through the Củ Chi District of South Vietnam in 1969.

In the years since the Vietnam War ended, tunnel rats have suffered from a high percentage of Agent Orange injuries and diseases due to soldiers' exposure to the chemicals on the ground, or that leached from topsoil into the tunnel environment. While in the tunnels, soldiers were breathing air heavily saturated with Agent Orange.

Afghanistan
Afghanistan features an extensive series of historic tunnels used for transporting water and the "kariz." During the 1979–1989 Soviet war in Afghanistan, such tunnels were used by Mujahideen fighters. The Soviet 40th Army therefore fielded their own tunnel clearance and demolition units, which were given the task of clearing the tunnels of enemy combatants, disarming booby traps, and destroying the underground complexes. According to contemporary accounts, the U.S. Marine Corps and British Royal Marines were involved in similar work in the war in Afghanistan.

Israel
SAMOOR ("weasel"), a formation within Israel's Yahalom elite combat engineer unit, is charged with many of the same missions that tunnel rats performed during the Vietnam War.

References

Sources

External links
 Australian Tunnel Rats

 
 
 

Vietnam War
Tunnel warfare
Military tactics